Ravine-Sèche, is a village in Haiti of the Saint-Marc Arrondissement in Artibonite department. It is the birthplace of notable writer and artist, Frankétienne.

References

Populated places in Artibonite (department)